The Mediterranean moray (sometimes also called Roman eel, Muraena helena, زريمباية) is a fish of the moray eel family. It has a long eel-like body and is found in the eastern Atlantic Ocean and Mediterranean Sea. Its bite can be dangerous to humans.

Appearance and characteristics

Its coloration varies from dark grey to dark brown with fine dark spots. The skin is slimy and without scales. The dorsal fin begins behind its head and continues to the caudal fin (fused with the anal fin). Pectoral fins are absent, teeth are long and sharp-pointed (like other morays), the mouth is long and robust and reaches behind the gills.

Ecology

The Mediterranean moray inhabits the coastal waters of the eastern Atlantic Ocean from the British Isles to the coast of Senegal; the waters of the Canary Islands and the Azores; and the Mediterranean Sea. It prefers rocky bottoms and lives in depths of from 16.5 to 264 feet (5 to 80 meters). It is a solitary and territorial species. The Mediterranean moray spends most of the day in cavities and clefts between rocks and is more active at night. It hunts fish, crayfish and cephalopods, but also feeds on dead animals.

The Mediterranean moray's reproduction is not well known. They spawn about 60,000 eggs into open water, from which planktonic transparent leptocephali hatch.

One parasitic crustacean, the trematode Folliculovarium mediterraneum and the flatworm Lecithochirium grandiporum are parasites of the Mediterranean moray.

Human importance
The bite of the Mediterranean moray can be dangerous mainly due to the mildly toxic slime of its skin. It can be utilized fresh and eaten broiled, boiled and baked. The skin can be used for leather.

References

External links
 

Muraena
Fish described in 1758
Taxa named by Carl Linnaeus